Bloomville is a village in Seneca County, Ohio, United States. The population was 956 at the 2010 census.

History
The first settlement at Bloomville was made in 1822. Bloomville was laid out in 1837. It was incorporated as a village in 1871. On November 5, 1889 the village suffered from a major fire.

Geography
Bloomville is located at  (41.051080, -83.013190).

Demographics

2010 census
As of the census of 2010, there were 956 people, 349 households, and 229 families living in the village. The racial makeup of the village was 97.4% White, 0.2% African American, 0.1% Native American, 0.7% from other races, and 1.6% from two or more races. Hispanic or Latino of any race were 2.1% of the population.

There were 349 households, of which 39.5% had children under the age of 18 living with them, 46.1% were married couples living together, 12.6% had a female householder with no husband present, 6.9% had a male householder with no wife present, and 34.4% were non-families. 29.8% of all households were made up of individuals, and 13.5% had someone living alone who was 65 years of age or older. The average household size was 2.66 and the average family size was 3.29.

The median age in the village was 34.3 years. 29.7% of residents were under the age of 18; 8.4% were between the ages of 18 and 24; 25.3% were from 25 to 44; 22.5% were from 45 to 64; and 14.2% were 65 years of age or older. The gender makeup of the village was 50.5% male and 49.5% female.

2000 census
As of the census of 2000, there were 1,045 people, 366 households, and 281 families living in the village. The population density was 1,720.3 people per square mile (661.4/km2). There were 390 housing units at an average density of 642.0 per square mile (246.9/km2). The racial makeup of the village was 97.51% White, 0.38% African American, 0.29% Native American, 1.15% from other races, and 0.67% from two or more races. Hispanic or Latino of any race were 3.06% of the population.

There were 366 households, out of which 42.1% had children under the age of 18 living with them, 59.6% were married couples living together, 12.8% had a female householder with no husband present, and 23.2% were non-families. 21.0% of all households were made up of individuals, and 11.5% had someone living alone who was 65 years of age or older. The average household size was 2.78 and the average family size was 3.18.

In the village, the population was spread out, with 31.1% under the age of 18, 9.2% from 18 to 24, 26.3% from 25 to 44, 19.0% from 45 to 64, and 14.4% who were 65 years of age or older. The median age was 32 years. For every 100 females there were 89.0 males. For every 100 females age 18 and over, there were 84.1 males.

The median income for a household in the village was $36,250, and the median income for a family was $39,519. Males had a median income of $30,223 versus $21,902 for females. The per capita income for the village was $13,396. About 5.0% of families and 5.8% of the population were below the poverty line, including 5.5% of those under age 18 and 6.6% of those age 65 or over.

References

Villages in Seneca County, Ohio
Villages in Ohio